Escalloniaceae is a family of flowering plants consisting of about 130 species in seven genera. In the APG II system it is one of eight families in the euasterids II clade (campanulids) that are unplaced as to order. More recent research has provided evidence that two of those families, Eremosynaceae and Tribelaceae, arose from within Escalloniaceae; the Angiosperm Phylogeny Website therefore merges these two families into Escalloniaceae, and also places the family alone in order Escalloniales.

The family has eight genera:
Anopterus
Eremosyne
Escallonia
Forgesia
Polyosma
Tribeles
Valdivia
Additionally, genus Rayenia was described in 2021 and placed in this family. It is closely related to Tribeles and consists of a single species (Rayenia malalcurensis) native to central Chile.

References

 
Asterid families